Richard Bisaccia (born June 3, 1960) is an American football coach who is the assistant head coach and special teams coordinator for the Green Bay Packers of the National Football League (NFL). He previously served as an assistant coach for the Dallas Cowboys, San Diego Chargers and Tampa Bay Buccaneers, and was an interim head coach for the Las Vegas Raiders in 2021, leading the Raiders to the playoffs in his lone season.

Early life and education
A former defensive back at Yankton College in South Dakota, the native of Yonkers, New York played football at and graduated from New Fairfield High School in Connecticut. He began his coaching career at Wayne State College in Wayne, Nebraska, in 1983. He earned a Bachelor of Science in Physical Education degree with a minor in Health Education from Wayne State.

Coaching career

Wayne State
In 1983, Bisaccia began his coaching career at Wayne State College as their defensive backs and special teams coach. In 1984, he became their quarterbacks and wide receivers coach.

South Carolina
In 1988, Bisaccia joined the University of South Carolina as a graduate assistant, tight ends and wide receivers coach. In 1989, he transitioned to be their defensive backs and special teams coach. In 1991, he served as their tight ends and special teams coach and as their running backs and special teams coach in 1992. Under Bisaccia, the Gamecocks led the SEC in kickoff returns in 1992 and set a school record for blocked kicks.

Clemson
In 1994, Bisaccia was hired by Clemson University as their running backs and special teams coach where he served in that role until 1998.

Ole Miss
In 1999, Bisaccia joined the University of Mississippi (Ole Miss) as their running backs and special teams coach. In 2000, he was promoted to assistant head coach.

Tampa Bay Buccaneers
In 2002, Bisaccia was hired by the Tampa Bay Buccaneers as their special teams coordinator under head coach Jon Gruden. That year, the Buccaneers went to Super Bowl XXXVII and defeated the Oakland Raiders to win the franchise’s first Super Bowl title by a score of 48–21. In 2007, Micheal Spurlock, under Bisaccia's special teams unit, became the first player in franchise history to return a kickoff for a touchdown, snapping a 32-season streak. In 2008, Bisaccia was promoted to assistant head coach, running backs coach and special teams coordinator. In 2009, Bisaccia was retained as assistant head coach and special teams coordinator under new head coach Raheem Morris.

San Diego Chargers
In 2011, Bisaccia was hired by the San Diego Chargers as their special teams coordinator under head coach Norv Turner. In 2012, he was promoted to assistant head coach.

Auburn
In January 2013, Bisaccia was hired to be the assistant head coach, running backs and special teams coach at Auburn University under head coach Gus Malzahn. Auburn released Bisaccia from his contract after less than a month to allow him to sign with the Cowboys.

Dallas Cowboys
On January 30, 2013, Bisaccia was hired by the Dallas Cowboys as their assistant head coach and special teams coordinator under head coach Jason Garrett. He remained in this position until the end of the 2017 season.

Oakland / Las Vegas Raiders
In 2018, Bisaccia was hired by the Oakland Raiders as their assistant head coach and special teams coordinator, reuniting with head coach Jon Gruden.

On October 11, 2021, Bisaccia was named the interim head coach of the Raiders following Gruden's resignation. On October 17, 2021, Bisaccia made his head coaching debut against the Denver Broncos and he led the Raiders to a 34–24 win.

Bisaccia led the Raiders to a 7–5 record, and qualified for the playoffs for the first time since 2016 after a win over the Los Angeles Chargers in the final week of the regular season. Bisaccia became the first interim head coach since Bruce Arians with the 2012 Indianapolis Colts to lead his team to a postseason berth.

Green Bay Packers
On February 8, 2022, Bisaccia was hired by the Green Bay Packers as their special teams coordinator. On March 10, 2023, Bisaccia was promoted to assistant head coach/special teams coordinator.

Head coaching record

* Interim head coach

Notes

References

External links
 Green Bay Packers bio
 Las Vegas Raiders bio

1960 births
Living people
American people of Italian descent
Clemson Tigers football coaches
Dallas Cowboys coaches
Las Vegas Raiders head coaches
Las Vegas Raiders coaches
Oakland Raiders coaches
Ole Miss Rebels football coaches
San Diego Chargers coaches
South Carolina Gamecocks football coaches
Tampa Bay Buccaneers coaches
Wayne State Wildcats football coaches
Yankton Greyhounds football players
Wayne State College alumni
People from New Fairfield, Connecticut
Sportspeople from Fairfield County, Connecticut
Sportspeople from Yonkers, New York
Coaches of American football from Connecticut
Players of American football from Connecticut
Green Bay Packers coaches